This is a list of places in the de facto Republic of Artsakh which have standing links to local communities in other countries known as "town twinning" (usually in Europe) or "sister cities" (usually in the rest of the world).

L
Lachin
 Highland, United States

M
Martakert
 Vagarshapat, Armenia

Martuni
 Les Pennes-Mirabeau, France

S
Stepanakert

 Franco da Rocha, Brazil
 Mairiporã, Brazil
 Montebello, United States

References

Nagorno-Karabakh Republic
Azerbaijan
Nagorno-Karabakh Republic
Azerbaijan
Republic of Artsakh-related lists
Cities and towns in the Republic of Artsakh